Eaglesham South Aerodrome  is located  south southwest of Eaglesham, Alberta, Canada.

See also
 Eaglesham/Bice Farm Aerodrome
 Eaglesham/Codesa South Aerodrome

References

External links
Page about this airport on COPA's Places to Fly airport directory

Registered aerodromes in Alberta
Birch Hills County